Ride the Lobster was the world's longest unicycle race, held in June 2008. 
This 800-kilometre international relay race around the roads of Nova Scotia, Canada was conceived by Edward Wedler. He gave the race its unusual name because he thought the roadways around Nova Scotia resembled a lobster. 

The five-day race had five stages, composed of four legs winding around the province of approximately 200 km each and one day of time trials. The first stage was from Yarmouth to Annapolis Royal. The second stage went to St. Margarets. The third stage was composed of two time trials, Hubbards in the morning and Truro in the early evening. The fourth stage was from Truro to Antigonish. The final stage went from Port Hawkesbury to Baddeck. The event coordinator, Heather LeBlanc, intentionally made early stages easier for the contestants and the final stretch difficult. 

It was originally proposed to hold the race annually but there have been no subsequent events.

Rules 
Each team was composed of four people—three riders and one in support. The support person was not allowed to ride. The three riders took turns completing the distance of the race. The rider was not be switched over the first 10 kilometres of each race day. After that, the team had full discretion as to how often they wanted to switch riders.

All riders completed the 21 km time trial.

The race 

In 2008, the inaugural race began on 16 June, with 104 riders (124 had qualified) in 35 teams from fourteen countries.

The race concluded in Cape Breton with contestants reaching the finish line between 5–7 pm on June 20. The winning team was awarded $5,000 in cash and prizes.

The pre-race hypothesis that geared unicycles would offer a significant advantage over non-'gunis' was seemingly born out, as the winning team rode gunis.

Results

References

External links 
 Official website
 Ride the Lobster Blog
 Race Results

Cycle races in Canada
Unicycling